Miss Grand Vietnam (Vietnamese: Hoa hậu Hòa bình Việt Nam) is a national beauty pageant in Vietnam. The first edition was held in 2022. Previously, all representatives were appointed to became Miss Grand Vietnam and competed at Miss Grand International.

Winners
Miss Grand Vietnam 2022 is Đoàn Thiên Ân from Long An, crowned on 1 October 2022.

Vietnam's representatives at Miss Grand International
Color keys

See also
Miss Vietnam
Miss World Vietnam
Miss Universe Vietnam
Miss Earth Vietnam
Miss Supranational Vietnam
Mister Vietnam
List of representatives of Vietnam at major modeling pageants

References

External links

Beauty pageants in Vietnam
Vietnam